Dina Al-Sabah (born February 28, 1974) is a professional figure competitor from Kuwait. She is the only female Arab athlete to achieve pro card status as of 2006, as well as the first female Arab athlete to ever stand on the Olympia stage.

Biography

Al-Sabah was born in Beirut, Lebanon; her mother is of Turkish and Syrian origin, while her father is Kuwaiti, Turkish and East African origin.

Al-Sabah started competing in 1999; she decided to try for the NPC Figure Nationals after winning the Monica Brant Fitness Classic in 2001. When trying to register for the nationals she found out that she had to be a United States citizen in order to be allowed to compete at any of the NPC pro qualifiers. The only way she could compete in the Pro Division of the IFBB was to have recommendation from the Kuwaiti national federation associated with the IFBB. Due to traditional Arab beliefs, women are not allowed to compete in any bodybuilding competitions, and she was denied a recommendation.

Her decision to compete and model has received criticism from conservative Arabs.

Al-Sabah is continuing her career as a fitness model, appearing in many fitness publications including Oxygen, Ironman, American Curves, Muscle and Fitness, Muscle Mag International and Flex. She is the co-host of Living Beautiful Radio. She is a passionate promoter of issues dealing with female sexuality as well as a reviewer of adult products catering to women and couples.

Vital stats
Full name: Dina Al-Sabah
Birthday: February 28
Place of birth: Beirut, Lebanon
Current state of residence: Nevada
Occupation: IFBB pro figure athlete, fitness model, information systems consultant, and radio host
Marital status: married
Height: 5'5"
Weight: 117-118 lbs (contest); 123-125 lbs (off-season)
Eye color: brown
Hair color: brown

Contest history
1999 NGA Mount Rodgers Cup Novice, 2nd
2000 NPC EastCoast Tournament of Champions (MW), 4th
2000 NPC BodyRock, 2nd (LW), won the Best Poser Award
2001 NPC Monica Brant Fitness Classic, 1st (Tall) and Overall
2001 NPC Jan Tana Figure, 1st (Tall), and Overall
2001 NPC NorthEastern Figure Classic, 3rd (Tall)
2002 NPC Pittsburgh Figure Championship, 3rd (Tall)
2002 NPC Bev Francis Atlantic States Figure Championship, 1st (Tall) and Overall
2002 NPC Debbie Kruck Figure Classic, 1st (Tall) and Overall
2002 NPC NorthEast Figure Classic, 1st (Tall) and Overall
2003 IFBB Pittsburgh Pro Figure, 4th
2003 IFBB NOC Figure Championships 6th
2003 IFBB NY Pro Figure Championships 2nd
2003 IFBB Jan Tana Pro Figure, 1st
2003 IFBB Miss Figure Olympia, 5th
2003 IFBB GNC Show of Strength, 3rd
2004 IFBB Figure International, 7th
2004 IFBB GNC Show of Strength, 14th
2004 IFBB Miss Figure Olympia, 13th
2006 IFBB Tournament of Champions Pro Figure, 9th
2006 IFBB Palm Beach Pro Figure, 12th
2006 IFBB Sacrament Pro Figure, 8th
2010 IFBB PBW Tampa Pro Bikini, 6th
2010 IFBB Jacksonville Pro Championships, 5th
2010 IFBB Tournament of Champions, 5th
2010 IFBB Detroit Pro, 3rd
2010 IFBB Bikini Olympia, 10th

Personal life
Sabah is married to David Alden. The couple have one son and one daughter.

See also
List of female fitness & figure competitors

Further reading

References

External links

1974 births
Living people
Sportspeople from Beirut
Lebanese emigrants to the United States
Al-Sabah, Dina
Fitness and figure competitors
Dina
American people of Kuwaiti descent
American people of Syrian descent
American people of Turkish descent
Lebanese people of Turkish descent
Kuwaiti bodybuilders
Kuwaiti people of Syrian descent
Kuwaiti people of Turkish descent
Sportspeople of Lebanese descent